Arthur Vichot (born 26 November 1988) is a French former professional cyclist, who rode professionally between 2010 and 2020, for the  and  teams. He is the nephew of Frédéric Vichot, who won stages in the Tour de France in 1984 and 1985.

Professional career
One tradition of the Tour Down Under is that the fans choose an unknown rider and treat him the way they would a star, by mobbing him at hotels and painting his name on the road. The rider must be a non-English speaking domestique who most likely will not get a start at a major race and will simply act as a bottle carrier. For 2010, in his first professional race, Arthur Vichot was chosen.

He started the 2011 season by taking fifth position at the Grand Prix d'Ouverture La Marseillaise. The next month, he went on to win the Boucles du Sud Ardèche, and he was selected to ride in Paris–Nice. Bad luck struck in the race as he crashed hard and cracked his clavicle, preventing him from racing the Ardennes classics. He was selected to race the Tour de France. He finished the event in 104th position after playing a role of domestique. In September, he achieved a solo victory near his home in the Tour du Doubs. He also cracked the top ten in the Grand Prix Cycliste de Montréal, finishing eighth.

In 2012, Vichot conquered the biggest victory of his career up to that point in the fifth stage of the Critérium du Dauphiné, a mountainous affair that led the riders across the Col de la Colombière. He was part of the breakaway that formed at the beginning of the race and resisted to the bunch. With  to go, Vichot distanced the remnants of the leading group, earning a solo victory.

In 2013 and 2016, Vichot won the French National Road Race Championships and the right to wear the coveted tricolor jersey in the Tour de France.

Major results

2008
 1st Stage 2 Grand Prix Guillaume Tell
 2nd Road race, National Under-23 Road Championships
2009
 3rd Overall Circuit des Ardennes
2010
 1st Stage 2 Paris–Corrèze
 8th Overall Tour de Wallonie
2011
 1st Les Boucles du Sud Ardèche
 1st Tour du Doubs
 5th Grand Prix d'Ouverture La Marseillaise
 8th Grand Prix Cycliste de Montréal
 9th Overall Étoile de Bessèges
2012
 1st Stage 5 Critérium du Dauphiné
 2nd Les Boucles du Sud Ardèche
 3rd Grand Prix d'Ouverture La Marseillaise
 10th Boucles de l'Aulne
2013
 1st  Road race, National Road Championships
 1st  Overall Tour du Haut Var
1st  Points classification
1st  Young rider classification
 2nd Grand Prix Cycliste de Québec
 4th Grand Prix de Plumelec-Morbihan
 9th Overall Étoile de Bessèges
 10th Overall Tour Méditerranéen
2014
 3rd Overall Paris–Nice
1st Stage 8
 3rd GP Ouest–France
 5th Overall Étoile de Bessèges
 5th Grand Prix d'Ouverture La Marseillaise
 8th Overall Tour du Limousin
2015
 7th Grand Prix de Wallonie
 8th Overall Circuit Cycliste Sarthe
 8th Vuelta a Murcia
2016
 1st  Road race, National Road Championships
 1st  Overall Tour du Haut Var
1st  Points classification
1st Stage 2
 2nd Boucles de l'Aulne
 3rd La Drôme Classic
 3rd Grand Prix de Plumelec-Morbihan
 5th Overall Étoile de Bessèges
 7th Grand Prix d'Ouverture La Marseillaise
 7th Trofeo Laigueglia
  Combativity award Stage 11 Tour de France
2017
 1st  Overall Tour du Haut Var
1st  Points classification
 1st Grand Prix d'Ouverture La Marseillaise
 2nd Overall Circuit de la Sarthe
 2nd La Drôme Classic
 4th Grand Prix de Plumelec-Morbihan
 6th Classic Sud-Ardèche
 7th Trofeo Laigueglia
2018
 1st  Overall Tour de l'Ain
1st Points classification
1st Stage 3
 2nd Boucles de l'Aulne
 4th Grand Prix de Plumelec-Morbihan
 5th La Drôme Classic
 7th Grand Prix Cycliste de Québec
 10th Overall Tour de Suisse
2019
 6th La Drôme Classic

Grand Tour general classification results timeline

References

External links

 
 
 
 Française des Jeux official website (French)
 Cyclingnews.com article about "Vichot mania"

1988 births
Living people
French male cyclists
Sportspeople from Doubs
Cyclists from Bourgogne-Franche-Comté
20th-century French people
21st-century French people